Frei, Frey, Fray, Frej, Freij, Freyr or Freÿr may refer to:

People
Frey (given name)
Frey (surname)
Fray (surname)
Frei family, a Chilean family formed by the descendants of Swiss Eduardo Frei Schlinz and Chilean Victoria Montalva Martínez
 Matt Frei (born 1963), British journalist and broadcaster
 Issawi Frej (born 1963), Israeli Arab politician
 Viva Frei (born 1979), Canadian YouTuber
 Saber Ben Frej (born 1979), Tunisian footballer
 Frej Larsson (born 1983), Swedish musician and rapper
 Frej Liewendahl (1902-1966), Finnish track and field athlete
 Frej Lindqvist (born 1937), Swedish actor
 Frej Ossiannilsson (1905–1995), Swedish entomologist

Places

Belgium
 Castle of Freÿr, a castle in Belgium

Brazil
Frei Gaspar, a municipality in the state of Minas Gerais in the Southeast Region
Frei Inocêncio, another municipality in the state of Minas Gerais
Frei Lagonegro, another municipality in the state of Minas Gerais
Frei Martinho, a municipality in the state of Paraíba in the Northeast Region
Frei Miguelinho, a municipality in the state of Pernambuco in the Northeast Region
Frei Rogério, a municipality in the state of Santa Catarina, in the South Region

Germany
Frei-Laubersheim, a municipality in the district of Bad Kreuznach in Rhineland-Palatinate, in western Germany

Norway
 Frei, a former municipality in Møre og Romsdal county
 Frei (island), an island in Kristiansund Municipality, Møre og Romsdal county
 Frei, or Nedre Frei, a village in Kristiansund Municipality, Møre og Romsdal county
 Frei Church, a church in Kristiansund Municipality, Møre og Romsdal county

United States 
 Frey, Michigan

Other uses
Frey (chocolate), a Swiss manufacturer of chocolate since 1887
Frei zu leben, a German entry in the Eurovision Song Contest 1990
FreiTek, Inc., a fictional company in Star Wars.
Frey's procedure, a treatment for chronic pancreatitis
Frei test, a test developed in 1925 by Wilhelm Siegmund Frei, a German dermatologist, to identify lymphogranuloma inguinale
Frey's syndrome, a food-related condition
Freyr, a fertility god in Norse mythology
Freyr (Stargate), a fictional character in Stargate SG-1, based on this god
Frej (icebreaker), a 1974 ship named after Freyr
Frei (album), the fifth studio album by German recording artist LaFee
 IK Frej, a Swedish sports club located in Täby kyrkby

See also
 Oulad Frej, a small town and rural commune in El Jadida Province of the Casablanca-Settat region of Morocco
 Fray (disambiguation)
 Freya (disambiguation)
 Fry (disambiguation)
 Frye